OWL2 may refer to:
Version 2 of the Web Ontology Language
Version 2 of the Official Tournament and Club Word List for Scrabble